Chamrao Parbat II is a mountain of the Garhwal Himalaya in Uttarakhand, India. It is situated in the Zaskar Range. It is 41st highest located entirely within the Uttarakhand. Nanda Devi, is the highest mountain in this category. It lies 6.6 km NW of Kamet . Its nearest higher neighbor Mukut Parbat  lies 2.5 km SE and it is 9 km NW of Mana NW . It lies 3.3 km SE of Chamrao Parbat I.

Climbing history
A four-member New Zealand expedition team comprising E. P. Hillary from Auckland, W. G. Lowe from Hastings, F. M. Cotter from Christchurch, and H. E. RIDDIFORD and four sherpas Pasang Dawa Lama, Nima, his brother Thundu, and Ylla Tenzing started their journey from Ranikhet on 2 June 1951 towards Badrinath. Their main objectives in this expedition is Nilkanth and Mukut Parbat. They had climbed many other peaks including P. 6760. W. G. LOWE and Hillary climbed P. 6760 on 5 August 1951.

Neighboring and subsidiary peaks
Neighboring or subsidiary peaks of Chamrao Parbat II:
 Kamet: 
 Mana Peak: 
 Mana Northwest: 
 Bidhan Parbat: 
 Mandir Parbat: 
 Abi Gamin:  
 Mukut Parbat: 
 Saraswati Parbat I: 
 Balbala:

Glaciers and rivers
Near by glaciers and river
Dakshini Chamrao glacier, Balbala glacier and Paschimi Kamet glacier all the glacier drain their water in the Saraswati River which then joins Alaknanda River near Mana village one of the main tributaries of Ganga river. The River Dhauli Ganga emerges from Purbi Kamet Glacier and met Alaknanda river at Vishnu Prayag an 82 km journey from its mouth. Alaknanda river is one of the main tributaries of Ganga.

See also

 List of Himalayan peaks of Uttarakhand

References

Mountains of Uttarakhand
Six-thousanders of the Himalayas
Geography of Chamoli district